The Diatrypaceae are a family of fungi in the order Xylariales. According to a 2008 estimate, the family has 13 genera and 229 species.

Genera
Genera include:
Allescherina
Anthostoma
Cryptosphaeria
Diatrype
Diatrypella
Dothideovalsa
Echinomyces
Eutypa
Eutypella
Leptoperidia
Libertella
Peroneutypa
Quaternaria
Rostronitschkia

References

Xylariales